Löfven Cabinet may refer to:
 Löfven I Cabinet, the first cabinet of Stefan Löfven (2014–2019)
 Löfven II Cabinet, the second cabinet of Stefan Löfven (2019–2021)
 Löfven III Cabinet, the third cabinet of Stefan Löfven (2021)